Completer or Malanstraube is a white Swiss wine grape variety grown  primarily in eastern Switzerland around Graubünden. The Completer vine was once domesticated but has now become mostly feral though some Swiss winemakers will make limited quantities of wine harvested from the wild vines. Wine produced from Completer tends to be very full bodied and aromatic.

Lafnetscha
According to wine expert Jancis Robinson, some ampelographers speculate that the Lafnetscha grape grown in the Valais region in southwest Switzerland is actually Completer of which Lafnetscha is a known synonym.

Synonyms
Completer is also known under the synonyms Lafnaetscha, Lafnetscha, Lafnetsela, Lindauer, Malans, Malanstraube, Malanstraube Weisse, Räuschling Edelweiss, Zürichersee, Zürichseer, Zürirebe, and Zurichersee.

References

White wine grape varieties